Marina Charlotte Kalla (born 22 July 1987 in Tärendö) is a former Swedish cross-country skier who competed at international level from 2003 to 2022. Kalla is a three-time Olympian, winning her first Olympic gold medal at the 2010 Winter Olympics in the 10 km freestyle event in Vancouver. At the 2014 Winter Olympics in Sochi Kalla ran the final leg in the 4 × 5 km women's relay race and started third with a 25.7 seconds lag behind the first place but reduced the gap, overtaking her competitors in the final straight, earning Sweden the first gold medal in the women's relay event since 1968. At the 2018 Winter Olympics in Pyeongchang Kalla won Olympic gold medal in the skiathlon event.

On 6 January 2008, Kalla won the second edition of Tour de Ski in her debut in the event.

Kalla won a gold medal at the FIS Nordic World Ski Championships 2015 10 km freestyle event in Falun. In total Kalla has twelve World Championship medals, five of them individual.

Kalla is of Tornedalian Finnish descent.

On 22 March 2022, Kalla announced she would quit her competitive carrier following the Swedish Championships in Piteå in March 2022.

Winter Olympics

2010 Winter Olympics
Kalla won the gold medal in the women's 10 km individual for Sweden at the 2010 Winter Olympics in Vancouver, British Columbia, Canada, with a time of 24:58.4. She also won a silver in the team sprint event with Anna Haag at those same games.

2014 Winter Olympics
Kalla won a silver medal in the skiathlon event on 8 February in Sochi, and another silver in the classical race on 13 February. In the 4 × 5 km women's relay race, held on 15 February, she ran in the final leg and started third with a 25.7 sec lag behind the first place and a 19.9 lag behind the second place, but totally reduced the gap, and overtook her competitors in the final straight, giving Sweden the gold medal.

2018 Winter Olympics
Kalla took the first gold medal awarded at the 2018 Games in Pyeongchang when she won the skiathlon, breaking away from the leading group on the last lap of the course to take victory with a lead of 7.8 seconds over second-placed Marit Bjørgen. Her win made her the first Swedish woman to win three Winter Olympic golds, and tied her with canoer Agneta Andersson as the female Swede with most Olympic gold medals overall. It was also Kalla's sixth Olympic medal, equalling Anja Pärson's record for the most Winter Olympic medals among Swedish women. She then went on to win silver in the 10 km freestyle individual start, the 4 × 5 km relay (together with Anna Haag, Ebba Andersson and Stina Nilsson) and the team sprint (with Stina Nilsson).

Cross-country skiing results
All results are sourced from the International Ski Federation (FIS).

Olympic Games
 9 medals – (3 gold, 6 silver)

World Championships
 13 medals – (3 gold, 6 silver, 4 bronze)

World Cup

Season standings

Individual podiums
 12 victories – (7 , 5 ) 
 59 podiums – (35 , 24 )

Team podiums
 3 victories – (2 , 1 )
 15 podiums – (14 , 1 )

Other sports
On 17–18 April 2015, Kalla participated and placed second in Keb Classic, a ski mountaineering event in Kebnekaise, Sweden, with Emelie Forsberg and Josefina Wikberg.

References

External links

17 March 2005 Charlotte Kalla interview at SVT's open archive 

1987 births
Swedish female cross-country skiers
Cross-country skiers at the 2010 Winter Olympics
Cross-country skiers at the 2014 Winter Olympics
Cross-country skiers at the 2018 Winter Olympics
Cross-country skiers at the 2022 Winter Olympics
Olympic cross-country skiers of Sweden
Medalists at the 2010 Winter Olympics
Medalists at the 2014 Winter Olympics
Medalists at the 2018 Winter Olympics
Olympic medalists in cross-country skiing
Olympic gold medalists for Sweden
Olympic silver medalists for Sweden
FIS Nordic World Ski Championships medalists in cross-country skiing
Swedish people of Finnish descent
Cross-country skiers from Norrbotten County
People from Pajala Municipality
Living people
Piteå Elit skiers
Tour de Ski winners
Tour de Ski skiers
Holmenkollen medalists